Streets Become Hallways is the debut EP of the Australian band The Hot Lies. It spent 30 weeks on the AIR Indie Charts and has since sold out all its copies.

Track listing

Personnel
 Peter Wood – vocals
 Benjamin Pix – guitar, backing vocals
 Josh Delsar – guitar
 Leaton Rose – bass, backing vocals
 Jared Brown – drums
 Marcus Hennig – guitar
 Dan Jones – producer, additional engineering
 Anj – engineer, mixing
 Darren Thompson – additional engineering
 Ian Miller – additional editing
 John Ruberto – mastering

References

2004 debut EPs
The Hot Lies albums